UCI BMX Racing World Cup is a series of events for BMX racing (bicycle motorcross) held under the regulations of the Union Cycliste Internationale (UCI), the sport's international governing body.

Seasons

Men's winners

Women's winners

Medal summary 
Ranking by seasons

References

External links
 Official website

BMX competitions
BMX
BMX
Supercross